Tamahau Karangatukituki Canning (born 7 April 1977) is an Australian-born former New Zealand cricketer who played four One Day Internationals.

Canning retired from all cricket on 24 December 2006 following a disciplinary breach and forcing him to return to Perth.

References

1977 births
Living people
New Zealand cricketers
New Zealand One Day International cricketers
Auckland cricketers
North Island cricketers